Dream with Me is an album by the American singer Tommy Sands. It was arranged by Nelson Riddle and released in 1960.

In his biography of Riddle, September in the Rain, Peter J. Levinson wrote that Riddle's arrangements for Sands were "as original and as stimulating as he wrote for any singer, and obviously Sands was musically comfortable with him". Sands subsequently described Riddle as the "best arranger I ever worked with".

In her book Great Pretenders: My Strange Love Affair with '50s Pop Music, Karen Schoemer describes Dream with Me as "a surrealist knock-out, a musing on the unreality of love. Angel voices hovered, tempos drifted like clouds, and the songs didn't seem to start and stop so much as get up, stretch, and lie down again. The effect was practically psychedelic".

Reception

The initial Billboard magazine review from 5 September 1960 awarded the album three stars and commented that Sands "tries very hard on this new album to handle a group of standards in a relaxed, romantic style, but it doesn't quite come off. He handles the tunes in fair fashion". Riddle's orchestrations were described as "excellent".

Track listing
 "Dream with Me" – 3:14
 "Will I Find My Love Today" – 3:29
 "Lazy Afternoon" (Jerome Moross, John La Touche) – 3:39
 "Far Away Places" (Joan Whitney, Alex Kramer) – 3:46
 "Whispering Grass" (Fred Fisher, Doris Fisher) – 3:11
 "A Dreamer's Holiday" (Mabel Wayne, Kim Gannon) – 3:22
 "When I Fall In Love" (Victor Young, Edward Young) – 3:29
 "Dreamsville" (Ray Evans, Jay Livingston, Henry Mancini) – 3:18
 "Lying In the Hay" (Jean Franc-Nohain, Mireille) – 2:48
 "It's So Peaceful In the Country" (Alec Wilder) – 3:52
 "Dream" – 3:27
 "A Boy and His Dreams" – 3:56

Personnel
Tommy Sands – vocals
Nelson Riddle – arranger

References

External links
 

1960 albums
Albums arranged by Nelson Riddle
Capitol Records albums
Tommy Sands (American singer) albums